Brian Boyer Bliss (born September 28, 1965) is a retired American soccer defender and front office executive. He also serves as an assistant coach for the United States U-20 national team.

Bliss played professionally in Europe and the United States, including the original Major Indoor Soccer League, American Soccer League, and American Professional Soccer League. He earned forty-four caps, scoring two goals, with the U.S. national soccer team and was part of 1990 FIFA World Cup squad.

Playing career

Early career
Bliss attended Webster Schroeder High School in Webster, New York. After high school, he attended Southern Connecticut State University from 1983 to 1986. On December 2, 1984, Bliss earned his first cap in a 2–2 tie with Ecuador. He would not play again until 1987 when he would play two of the three U.S. games. That year, the Cleveland Force of the Major Indoor Soccer League drafted Bliss with the top pick. He would play a single season with the Force in 1987–1988. In 1988, he played in the Summer Olympics. In 1989, Bliss played five games with the Albany Capitals of the American Soccer League. However, by that time he was a regular with the national team, playing nearly every game in the team's qualification campaign for the 1990 FIFA World Cup. He played only one of the team's three games in that cup, as a substitute in the loss to Austria. In 1990, he was on the roster of the Boston Bolts of the American Professional Soccer League.

European career
After the World Cup, Bliss went to Germany to play with Energie Cottbus of the 1990–91 NOFV-Oberliga. He later went on to play for Chemnitzer FC and then FC Carl Zeiss Jena. Bliss was one of the last cuts from the final 1994 FIFA World Cup roster when he tore cartilage in his knee.

Major League Soccer
As Major League Soccer prepared for its first season, it began a process of equitably distributing known players to each of the league's teams. As part of this process, Bliss was allocated to the Columbus Crew. He played a season and a half for Columbus, being traded 12 games into the 1997 season to the MetroStars for A.J. Wood. Bliss finished the 1997 season with the MetroStars, but was traded by the team to the Kansas City Wizards for a first round college draft pick during the 1998 off-season. He played only three games of the 1998 season.  In 1999, he finished his career with the Connecticut Wolves.

Coaching career
After retirement, he went on to coach the Connecticut Wolves of the A-League in 1999. The next year, Gansler selected him again, this time to be the assistant coach for the Wizards. On July 19, 2006, Gansler stepped down as head coach, allowing Bliss to become interim head coach for Kansas City. In March 2007, Curt Onalfo replaced Bliss as the Wizards  head coach, and Bliss joined Kansas Youth Soccer as State Director of Coaching. He also coached the JV squad at Olathe Northwest Highschool where he coached Andy Cockrum who went on to play for La Masia, which is FC Barcelona's academy team.

Bliss served as the technical director of the Columbus Crew for six seasons, helping the Crew earn two Supporters' Shield and one MLS Cup. He served as interim head coach for part of the 2013 season following the dismissal of Robert Warzycha, but he was not retained as head coach and departed for Chicago following the hiring of Gregg Berhalter.

On September 20, 2015, Bliss was named interim coach of the Chicago Fire, while retaining his technical director duties at the club.

He joined Sporting Kansas City as Director of Player Personnel in January 2016.

Career statistics

References

External links
 Brian Bliss at USSoccerPlayers.com 
 

1965 births
Living people
1990 FIFA World Cup players
1995 Copa América players
2. Bundesliga players
Albany Capitals players
American expatriate soccer players
American expatriate soccer players in Germany
American Professional Soccer League players
American soccer coaches
American Soccer League (1988–89) players
American soccer players
Boston Bolts players
Chemnitzer FC players
Cleveland Force (original MISL) players
Columbus Crew players
Columbus Crew coaches
Connecticut Wolves players
Expatriate footballers in East Germany
FC Carl Zeiss Jena players
FC Energie Cottbus players
Association football defenders
Footballers at the 1988 Summer Olympics
Sporting Kansas City coaches
Sporting Kansas City players
Major Indoor Soccer League (1978–1992) players
Major League Soccer players
New York Red Bulls players
Olympic soccer players of the United States
People from Webster, New York
Soccer players from New York (state)
Southern Connecticut Fighting Owls men's soccer players
United States men's international soccer players
A-League (1995–2004) players
Columbus Crew non-playing staff
Major League Soccer coaches
Sporting Kansas City non-playing staff
DDR-Oberliga players
Chicago Fire FC coaches